The Deputy Chief Minister of Jharkhand is a part of the government of the north Indian state of Jharkhand.

Keys
Color Key for the party of Deputy Chief Minister

List of Deputy Chief Ministers

References

Deputy chief ministers of Jharkhand
Government of Jharkhand
Jharkhand-related lists
Jharkhand